Unthank is a small village near Harwood in County Durham, England.

References

Villages in County Durham